Gaston Mobati (4 September 1961 – 15 May 1995), was a Congolese professional footballer who played as a striker.

Career
Mobati was born in Kinshasa. He had a spell with Ethnikos Piraeus F.C. in the Greek Super League during the 1989–90 season.

References

1961 births
1995 deaths
Footballers from Kinshasa
Democratic Republic of the Congo footballers
Democratic Republic of the Congo international footballers
Association football forwards
FC Montceau Bourgogne players
Ligue 1 players
Ligue 2 players
Super League Greece players
Lille OSC players
En Avant Guingamp players
Ethnikos Piraeus F.C. players
AS Beauvais Oise players
1988 African Cup of Nations players
Democratic Republic of the Congo expatriate footballers
Expatriate footballers in France
Expatriate footballers in Greece
Democratic Republic of the Congo expatriate sportspeople in France
Democratic Republic of the Congo expatriate sportspeople in Greece